Peter Beck (born 1967) is a German politician for the Liberal Conservative Reformers. Since 2019, he has been a member of the Bürgerschaft of Bremen

Life and politics

Beck was born in 1967 and became a police officer.
After the 2019 Bremen state election, he became member of the Bürgerschaft, the Breman state parliament. In September 2019, he became the chairman of his party in the state of Bremen after the resignation of Frank Magnitz.

References

1967 births
Alternative for Germany politicians
Politicians from Bremen
Living people